Trillian may refer to:    

 Trillian (character), a fictional character in The Hitchhiker's Guide to the Galaxy
 Trillian (software), an instant messaging application
 Project Trillian, an effort to port the Linux kernel to the Itanium processor

See also

 Trillion (disambiguation)